The West–East Gas Pipeline is a set of natural gas pipelines which run from the western part of China to the east.

PetroChina Pipelines
PetroChina Pipelines is a subsidiary (72.26%) of PetroChina that managed the first three pipelines of the project.

West–East Gas Pipeline I

History
The construction of the West–East Gas Pipeline started in 2002. The pipeline was put into trial operation on 1 October 2004, and the full commercial supply of natural gas commenced on 1 January 2005. The pipeline is owned and operated by PetroChina West–East Gas Pipeline Company, a subsidiary of PetroChina. Originally, it was agreed that PetroChina would have owned 50% of the pipeline, while Royal Dutch Shell, Gazprom, and ExxonMobil had been slated to hold 15% each, and Sinopec 5%. However, in August 2004, the Board of Directors of PetroChina announced that following good faith discussions with all parties to the Joint Venture Framework Agreement, the parties had not been able to reach an agreement, and the joint venture framework agreement was terminated.

Technical features
The pipeline passes through 66 cities in the 10 provinces in China. Natural gas transported by the pipeline is used for electricity production in the Yangtze River Delta area. There is a plan to replace coal with gas in Shanghai by 2010.
The cost of the pipeline was US$5.7 billion. For this purpose, ten new gas compressor stations will be built and eight existing stations are to be upgraded.

Connections
The West–East Gas Pipeline is connected to the Shaan-Jing pipeline by three branch pipelines.

Source of supply
The pipeline is supplied from the Tarim Basin oil and gas fields in Xinjiang province. The Changqing gas area in Shaanxi province is a secondary gas source. In the future, the planned Kazakhstan-China gas pipeline will be connected to the West–East Gas Pipeline.

Starting from 15 September 2009, the pipeline is also supplied with coalbed methane from the Qinshui Basin in Shanxi.

West–East Gas Pipeline II

Construction of the second West–East Gas Pipeline started on 22 February 2008. Up to Gansu, it will be parallel and interconnected with the first west-east pipeline. The western part of the pipeline is expected to be commissioned by 2009, and the eastern part by June 2011.

It is mainly supplied by the Central Asia-China gas pipeline. The pipeline is expected to cost US$20 billion. The project is developed by China National Oil and Gas Exploration and Development Corp. (CNODC), a joint venture of China National Petroleum Corporation and PetroChina.

West–East Gas Pipeline III

Construction of the third pipeline started in October 2012 and it is to be completed by 2015. The third pipeline will run from Horgos in western Xinjiang to Fuzhou in Fujian.  It will cross Xinjiang, Gansu, Ningxia, Shaanxi, Henan, Hubei, Hunan, Jiangxi, Fujian, and Guangdong provinces.

In addition, the project includes three gas storages and a LNG plant. The pipeline will be supplied from Central Asia–China gas pipeline's Line C supplemented by supplies from the Tarim basin and coalbed methane in Xinjiang. Compressors for the pipeline are supplied by Rolls-Royce.

West–East Gas Pipeline IV and V
The fourth pipeline will start from the Tarim Basin or from Sichuan.

See also

Sichuan–Shanghai gas pipeline
Shaan–Jing pipeline
 Zhongxian–Wuhan Pipeline

References

External links
 West-East Gas Pipeline project, by china.org.cn
 The West-East Gas Pipeline Project, by PetroChina
 Second West-East Gas Pipeline

Natural gas pipelines in China